Grégory Lacombe (born 11 January 1982) is a French former professional footballer who played as a midfielder for clubs in Ligue 1 and Ligue 2.

Career
A native of Albi, Lacombe signed his first professional football contract with AS Monaco at age 17. He was part of the Monaco side that won the 1999–2000 French Division 1 title. Lacombe had two brief spells with AC Ajaccio and one with Portuguese side Vitória F.C. before a six-year association with Montpellier HSC. Lacombe also won the 2011–12 Ligue 1 title while playing for Montpellier.

References

External links

French footballers
French expatriate footballers
AS Monaco FC players
AC Ajaccio players
Montpellier HSC players
Vitória F.C. players
Clermont Foot players
ES Uzès Pont du Gard players
Ligue 1 players
Ligue 2 players
Primeira Liga players
Championnat National players
Expatriate footballers in Portugal
Sportspeople from Albi
1982 births
Living people
Association football midfielders
Footballers from Occitania (administrative region)
French expatriate sportspeople in Portugal